Kym Gold is an American fashion and home design executive. She is the founder of Bella Dahl, Hippie Jeans, Babakul, and Style Union Home, and the co-founder of designer jeans brand True Religion. Gold's designs have been worn by David Beckham, Tom Ford, Angelina Jolie, Donna Karan, Heidi Klum, Jennifer Lopez, Madonna, Gwyneth Paltrow, Gwen Stefani, Holly Robinson Peete, and Justin Timberlake. Her work has been included in Vogue, Elle, Harper's Bazaar, InStyle, and Rolling Stone magazines.

Early life
Gold was born in California to a Jewish family. She is an identical triplet.

Career

True Religion

Gold co-founded True Religion with her then-husband, Jeff Lubell. Gold created a high-end denim line catering to all body types. The company eventually went public on the Stock exchange.

According to Gold's autobiography, she served as vice president of True Religion. She created designs, and Jeff would source materials. Lubell and Gold's management styles conflicted, with Gold blaming a toxic, masculine corporate culture at the company, led by Lubell. Lubell managed the board of directors and Gold's role was often minimized. The couple separated. Lubell filed for divorce on February 14, 2007. True Religion informed her that she was no longer part of the company as an employee. She would remain a board member.

In 2013, Gold sold her share of True Religion for over $800 million. In 2017, True Religion declared bankruptcy.

Other business ventures
In 2008, Gold started Babakul, a bohemian chic clothing line sold in Southern California. Heidi Klum, Tom Ford, Gwyneth Paltrow, and Madonna have worn Babakul.

Gold founded Los Angeles-created ceramic design company Style Union Home. She founded the company due to her struggle to find particular designs for home staging.

Views on women's roles in the workplace and toxic masculinity
Gold's past experiences with True Religion motivated her to build all-female teams. In an interview with Medium, Gold states, "when I was at True Religion, it was all-male board members, and I was one of the largest shareholders and treated like shit. I feel that because of that experience, almost everybody in my life, my doctors, my lawyers, my accountants, my team, are all women."

Gold has also noted Gloria Steinem as someone she admires, stating," Any woman who is a pioneer or leader is an inspiration to me, the women's movement was a huge step for women in general. However, we still have a long road ahead to be equal to men in the world of business." Gold is also a  philanthropist, supporting causes concentrating on women's health issues.

Works by Kym Gold
Gold Standard: How to Rock the World and Run an Empire. New York: Skyhorse (2015).

Personal life
Gold's first husband was producer Mark Burnett. The couple married at Gold's parents Malibu home, and the couple parted after one year.

About a year later, Gold began dating Jeff Lubell. He and Gold eventually moved in together, got married, and had children. They have three sons, Jake, Ryan, and Dylan. Though the couple was together for about twenty years. The couple filed for divorce in 2007.

Today, Gold is married to television and film actor Marlon Young. The couple met through a mutual friend, Eric Benét.

References

External links
Style Union Home official website

21st-century American businesswomen
21st-century American businesspeople
American Jews
American real estate businesspeople
21st-century American women writers
21st-century American non-fiction writers
Year of birth missing (living people)
Living people
People from Malibu, California
Triplets
American manufacturing businesspeople
Businesspeople from California
Jewish women in business
Jewish fashion designers
American women fashion designers
American fashion designers
American women interior designers
Jewish women philanthropists
American women philanthropists
21st-century women philanthropists
American feminists